The Benedictines of Mary, Queen of Apostles, are a Benedictine order of nuns founded by Sr Mary Wilhelmina, OSB, in Gower, Missouri. The nuns are also recording artists, and their first two albums of recorded chants and hymns reached number one on the classical traditional Billboard charts. They were thereafter named Billboard's Classical Traditional artists of the year in 2013, the first order of nuns to win an award in the history of Billboard.

Their album sales have been used to improve the monastery and pay off the abbey's debt. The community also attends Mass in the extraordinary form (Traditional Latin Mass) and prays the 1962 Monastic Breviary.

History

The community was established in 1995 as a small order of Benedictine nuns under the auspices of the Priestly Fraternity of St. Peter, who are based in Scranton, Pennsylvania. They were founded by Sr Mary Wilhelmina, OSB, an African-American nun formerly part of the Oblate Sisters of Providence (founded by Mother Mary Lange in 1829 as the first-ever Black religious order in America). 

Wilhelmina had found her traditional tastes incompatible with the Oblates' changing ethos, and decided to start her own community. Her new group of sisters were originally called the Oblates of Mary, Queen of Apostles, and began following a monastic horarium defined in the Rule of Saint Benedict, and chanting the Divine Office in Latin according to the 1962 Breviarium Monasticum.

Upon his arrival in the Diocese of Kansas City-Saint Joseph in 2005, Bishop Robert Finn said that vocations to the priesthood and religious life would be seen as a "super-priority" for his diocese. In March 2006, Finn invited the order to his diocese. The nuns relocated to Gower, Missouri and were established as a public association of the faithful with the new name "Benedictines of Mary, Queen of Apostles".
In September 2018, its priory was raised to abbey and their new Abbey Church was consecrated by Bishop Robert Finn. Mother Cecilia was the first abbess to receive the Abbatial Blessing according to the traditional Pontificale in the United States.

Recordings
The nuns sing together daily, typically for five hours per day, as part of their daily life of prayer. The group have released a number of recordings of their songs. Their debut recording Advent At Ephesus, released at the end of 2012, reached number 2 on Billboard's Classical Traditional Music Chart and number 14 on the Classical Music Overall Chart. They were named Billboard's Classical Traditional Artist 2012 and 2013, the first order of nuns to win an award in the history of Billboard magazine.

Both their first two albums of their recorded chants and hymns reached number 1 on the classical traditional Billboard charts in 2013. As of 9 August 2013, the group's second album Angels and Saints at Ephesus reached the number 1 position on the Billboard traditional classical albums chart for 13 weeks, a record duration on that chart since 2006. As of July 2013, the album also reached number 3 on Billboard's Bestselling Internet Album Chart, number 7 on its Contemporary Christian and Christian Gospel charts, and number 127 on the "Billboard 200" weekly ranking of the 200 highest-selling music albums and EPs in the United States. The album has sold 49,000 copies in the United States as of February 2015.

Album sales have been used to improve the monastery and pay off the abbey's debt. The music was arranged by the abbess Mother Cecilia as of 2014.

Discography
 Advent at Ephesus, De Montfort Music/Decca Records, released 20 November 2012
 Angels and Saints at Ephesus, De Montfort Music/Decca Records, released 7 May 2013
 Lent at Ephesus, De Montfort Music/Decca Records/Universal Music Classics, released 11 February 2014
 Easter at Ephesus, De Montfort Music/Decca Records/Universal Music Classics, released 3 March 2015
 Adoration at Ephesus, self-published, released 26 April 2016
 Caroling at Ephesus, self-published, released 1 November 2016
 The Hearts of Jesus, Mary & Joseph at Ephesus, self-published, released 1 May 2018
Christ the King at Ephesus, self-published, released 26 October 2021
Tenebrae at Ephesus, self-published, released 08 April 2022
The Holy Trinity at Ephesus, self-published, released 11 November 2022

References

External links

Benedictine congregations
Benedictine monasteries in the United States
Traditionalist Catholic nuns and religious sisters
Catholic religious orders established in the 20th century
Roman Catholic Ecclesiastical Province of Saint Louis
Catholic musical groups
A cappella musical groups